Bicyclic phosphate is a class of organophosphate compounds that are used as flame retardants, stabilizers and antioxidants. They are also used in spectroscopic studies.

Some bicyclic phosphates, such as TBPS, TBPO and IPTBO, are highly toxic. They have toxicity comparable to nerve agents. However, they are not acetylcholinesterase inhibitors. They act as GABA receptor antagonists and have potent convulsant effects.

See also
Convulsant
TBPS
TBPO
IPTBO

References

 
Convulsants
Neurotoxins
GABAA receptor negative allosteric modulators
Organophosphates
Phosphate esters